One of the major subfields of urban economics, economies of agglomeration (or agglomeration effects) describes, in broad terms, how urban agglomeration occurs in locations where cost savings can naturally arise. Most often discussed in terms of economic firm productivity, agglomeration effects can also explain the phenomenon where large proportions of the population are clustered in cities and major urban centres. Similar to economies of scale, the costs and benefits of agglomerating increase the larger the agglomerated urban cluster becomes. A prominent example of where agglomeration has brought together firms of a specific industry is Silicon Valley in California, USA.

As more firms in related fields of business cluster together, their costs of production may decline significantly (firms have competing multiple suppliers; greater specialization and division of labor result).  Even when competing firms in the same sector cluster, there may be advantages because the cluster attracts more suppliers and customers than a single firm could achieve alone. Cities form and grow to exploit economies of agglomeration.

Diseconomies of agglomeration are the opposite. For example, spatially concentrated growth in automobile-oriented fields may create problems of crowding and traffic congestion. It is the tension between economies and diseconomies that allows cities to grow but keeps them from becoming too large.

At the foundational level, proximity – especially to other facilities and suppliers – is a driving force behind economic growth, and is one explanation for why agglomeration effects are so evident in major urban centres. While the concentration of economic activity in cities has a positive effect on their development and growth, cities in turn help foster economic activity by accommodating for population growth, driving wage increases, and facilitating technological change.

Advantages of agglomeration
When firms form clusters of economic activity, there are particular development strategies that flow in and throughout this area of economic activity. This helps to accumulate information and the flow of new and innovative ideas among firms for the achievement of what economists call increasing returns to scale. Increasing returns to scale, and economies of scale, are internal to a firm and may allow for the establishment of more of the same firm outside the area or region. Economies of scale external to a firm are the result of spatial proximity and are referred to as agglomeration economies of scale. Agglomeration economies may be external to a firm but internal to a region. 

Increasing returns to scale, according to Beckmann, are integral to understanding why urban centres form. These increasing returns to scale "give rise to [urban systems]", capturing "the trade-off between transportation costs and economies of scale". Agglomeration economies exist when production is cheaper because of this clustering of economic activity. As a result of this clustering it becomes possible to establish other businesses that may take advantage of these economies without joining any big organization.
This process may help to urbanize areas as well.

Benefits arise from the spatial agglomeration of physical capital, companies, consumers and workers:
 Low transport costs: physical proximity to other firms and centres of production can minimise costs associated with transportation. While this may have been the case for many manufacturing firms in the United States, Glaeser and Gottlieb argue that reducing transportation costs is more important for firms producing services. Moreover, other studies have shown that when negative externalities like pollution are taken into account, agglomerated city centres are more likely to be dispersed over a larger geographical area rather than be confined to a single, metropolis-like urban region.
 Geographic advantages: a longstanding theory in urban economic literature is that firms (and cities) are likely to agglomerate where there are natural geographic advantages, which would give these firms both comparative and cost advantages over their competitors. Ellison and Glaeser argue that while this may be true for firms whose location decisions are highly sensitive to cost differences or geographic locations, such as the wine industry, they find that only 20% of geographic agglomeration effects in the United States can be explained by "natural" cost advantages.
 Labour pooling and matching: agglomerating effects, such as an increase in population and therefore human capital, arguably help improve matching within the economy, e.g. employees with employers, suppliers with buyers, and so on. Moreover, massive urban areas like cities which contain a multitude of industries in a localised area, can help firms offset their reaction to shocks more efficiently by 'pooling' labour resources together.
 Knowledge spillovers: the accumulation of knowledge and human capital in concentrated areas like major urban centres can contribute to the sharing of production technologies (i.e. know-how) between firms. Econometric analysis by Liang and Goetz showed that agglomeration effects account for technology-intensive industries benefitting from Jacobs-type knowledge spillovers. Furthermore, agglomerated centres of production, like cities, also facilitate learning – that is, knowledge generation, diffusion, and accumulation – on a larger scale than smaller economic regions.

Disadvantages of agglomeration

While the existence of cities can only persist if the advantages outweigh the disadvantages, agglomeration may also lead to traffic congestion, pollution and other negative externalities caused by the clustering of a population of firms and people and that this may lead to diseconomies of scale. Another source of agglomeration diseconomies—higher crowding and increased waiting time—can be observed in disciplines or industries that are characterized by constrained access to relevant production facilities or resources. As stated above, these factors are what decrease the pricing power of firms because of the many competitors in the area as well as a shortage of labor and lack of flexibility among firms to the laborers abound. Large cities experience these problems, and it is this tension between agglomeration economies and agglomeration dis-economies that may contribute to the growth of the area, control the growth of the area, or cause the area to experience a lack of growth.

The economies of agglomeration has also been shown to increase inequality both within urban areas, and between urban and rural areas. The Oxford development economist Paul Collier has proposed that the gains of agglomeration should be taxed as rents which lead to behaviour-distorting rent-seeking (Henry George theorem). This would be both ethical and efficient, in that gains would be better aligned with deserts and rent-seeking would be curbed. Collier recommends a tax calculated by combining high income and metropolitan location, which can then be redistributed to other cities that have been hard hit by agglomeration.

The disadvantages of agglomerations are to be mentioned:
 Strong environmental pressures
 High land prices
 Bottlenecks in public goods (e.g. poor/overburdened infrastructure)
 Corruption
 High competitive pressure
 Lack of reserve areas
 Economic inequality

Types of economies 
There are two types of economies that are considered large-scale and have external economies of scale; localization and urbanization economies. Localization economies arise from many firms in the same industry locate close to each other. There are three sources of localization economies: The first is the benefits of labor pooling which is the accessibility that firms have to a variety of skilled laborers, which in turn provides employment opportunity for the laborers. The second benefit is the development of industries due to the increasing returns to scale in intermediate inputs for a product; and the third source is the relative ease of communication and exchange of supplies, laborers and innovative ideas due to the proximity among firms.

Core-periphery model 
Whilst localization and urbanization economies as well as their sources are crucial to sustaining agglomeration economies and cities, it is important to understand the long-term result of the function of agglomeration economies which relates to the core-periphery model. The core-periphery model basically features an amount of economic activity in one main area surrounded by a remote area of less dense activity. The concentration of this economic activity in one area (usually a city center) allows for the growth and expansion of activity into other and surrounding areas because of the cost-minimizing location decisions of firms within these agglomeration economies sustaining high productivity and advantages which therefore allow them to grow outside of the city (core) and into the periphery. A small decrease in the fixed cost of production can increase the range of locations for further establishment of firms leading to loss of concentration in the city and possibly the development of a new city outside the original city where agglomeration and increasing returns to scale existed.

If localization economies were the main factor contributing to why cities exist with the exclusion of urbanization economies, then it would make sense for each firm in the same industry to form their own city. However, in a more realistic sense cities are more complex than that, which is the reason for the combination of localization and urbanization economies to form large cities.

Source of economies 
From the localization of firms emerges labor market pooling. Large populations of skilled laborers enter the area and are able to exchange knowledge, ideas, and information. The more firms there are in this area, the greater the competition is to obtain workers and therefore results in higher wages for the workers. However, the fewer firms there are and the more workers there are at a location the lower the wage becomes for those workers.

The second contribution towards localization economies is the access to specialized goods and services provided for the clustering firms. This access to specialized goods and services are known as intermediate inputs and provides increasing returns to scale for each of the firms located within that area because of the proximity to available sources needed for production. If intermediate inputs are tradable, there forms a core-periphery notion that will have many firms locate near each other to be closer to their needed sources. If there are tradable resources and services nearby but no related industries in the same area, there are no networking linkages and therefore makes it difficult for all firms in the area to obtain resources and increase production. The decreased transportation costs associated with clustering of firms leads to the increase in likelihood to a core-periphery pattern; where the result of this will be more intermediate inputs will be focused at the core and therefore will attract more firms in related industries.

The third source relating to localization economies is technological spillovers. One final advantage of this source is that clustering in specific fields leads to quicker diffusion of ideas or adoption of ideas. In order for production to be at its maximum and sell their products, firms require some sort of feasible access to capital markets. New forms of technology can create problems and involve risk; the clustering of firms creates an advantage to reduce the amount of uncertainty and complications involved with the use of new technology through information flow. The industry of capital flow and technology are concentrated within specific areas and therefore it is to the advantage of the firm to locate near these areas. This technological impact specifically in the communications field will provide and dismiss the barrier between firms in the same industry located further away as well as nearby which would lead to a greater concentration of information flow and economic production and activity. Furthermore, technological spillovers may be more beneficial to smaller cities in their growth than larger cities because of the existing informational networks in larger cities that already helped them to form and grow.

See also 

 Cluster effect
 Cluster initiative
 Business cluster
 Hotelling's law
 Economies of density
 Gains from trade
 Returns to scale

Sources 
 Brueckner, Jan. "Lectures in Urban Economics." 2011. The MIT Press
 O'Flaherty, Brendan. City Economics. Cambridge, Massachusetts. London, England. 2005. Harvard University Press
 Coe, Neil M., Kelly, Philip F., Yeung, Henry W.C. Economic Geography: A Contemporary Introduction.''' Malden, Massachusetts. Oxford, United Kingdom. Victoria, Australia. 2007. Blackwell Publishing
 Bogart, William Thomas. The Economics of Cities and Suburbs. Upper Saddle River, New Jersey. 1998. Prentice Hall
 Strange, William C.,  2008, "urban agglomeration," The New Palgrave Dictionary of Economics, 2nd Edition. Abstract.
 Venables, Anthony, 2008.  "new economic geography," The New Palgrave Dictionary of Economics, 2nd Edition. Abstract.

Further reading

 Rosenthal, Stuart S., and William C. Strange. 2020. "How Close Is Close? The Spatial Reach of Agglomeration Economies." Journal of Economic Perspectives,'' 34 (3): 27-49.

References

Economic geography